Geo Costiniu (23 April 1950, Bucharest – 12 November 2013) was a Romanian film actor.

Born in Bucharest, he died in the same city.

Filmography

References

External links

1950 births
2013 deaths
Romanian male film actors
Male actors from Bucharest
Burials at Bellu Cemetery